Patrick Stokes (1883 – 15 November 1959) was an English professional footballer who played as a winger.

References

1883 births
1959 deaths
Footballers from Stockton-on-Tees
Footballers from County Durham
English footballers
Association football wingers
Shildon A.F.C. players
Denaby United F.C. players
Grimsby Town F.C. players
Oldham Athletic A.F.C. players
English Football League players